Sopište is a municipality in and the seat of the municipality of Sopište, North Macedonia.

Demographics
According to the 2002 census, the village had a total of 5,325 inhabitants. Ethnic groups in the village include:

Macedonians 5,255
Turks 1
Serbs 39
Aromanians 11
Others 19

References

Villages in Sopište Municipality